Sejad is a masculine Bosnian given name equivalent to the Arabic masculine given name Sa'id. . Notable people with the name include:
Sejad Krdžalić
Sejad Salihović

See also 

 Sead (name)

Bosniak masculine given names
Bosnian masculine given names